The Saleen S5S Raptor is an American prototype concept car developed and built by American high performance automotive company Saleen. It was first publicly unveiled on March 20, 2008 at the 2008 New York International Auto Show.

The S5S Raptor was designed in 2007 at the ASC design studio in Metro Detroit, and is intended to be equipped with a  supercharged Saleen engine (similar to that used on the 2008 S302E) which will yield .

Awards and recognition
2009 Best Exotic Concept, DuPont REGISTRY

In media 
 The Saleen S5S Raptor is featured in many video games; which include CSR Racing, Forza Motorsport 3, Forza Horizon, Forza Motorsport 4 & Forza Horizon 4 as a playable car.

References

S5S
Rear mid-engine, rear-wheel-drive vehicles
Concept cars